Gail D. Zimmerman (born February 9, 1933) is an American politician and professor from Casper, Wyoming who served in both chambers of the Wyoming Legislature, representing Natrona County as a Republican in the Wyoming House of Representatives from 1985 to 1989 and the Wyoming Senate from 1989 to 1999.

Early life and education
Zimmerman was born in Dodge City, Kansas on February 9, 1933. After finishing high school, he served in the United States Army during the Korean War, though did not finish his training prior to the cease-fire.

Zimmerman received his undergraduate while living in Nebraska, obtaining a Bachelor of Arts from the University of Wyoming. After returning home from the army, he attended the University of Montana and obtained a Master of Arts before returning to the University of Wyoming for a Ph.D. in Physiology and Microbiology. Zimmerman also obtained degrees from Wauneta High School and Nebraska State College.

After teaching for many years, Zimmerman obtained an education in brokering.

Career
Zimmerman represented Natrona County as a Republican in both chambers of the Wyoming Legislature. He served in the Wyoming House of Representatives from 1985 to 1989 and the Wyoming Senate from 1989 to 1999.

On October 20, 1989, Zimmerman resigned from his seat in the Wyoming House of Representatives after being appointed to replace Thomas F. Stroock in the 50th Wyoming Legislature, following Stroock being named the United States ambassador to Guatemala.

During his time in office, Zimmerman served on the standing committee of Revenue, in addition to the following committees.
House Education Committee (1985–1988)
House Corporations, Elections and Political Subdivisions Committee (1985–1988)
Senate Appropriations Committee (1989–1992)
Senate Corporations, Elections and Political Subdivisions Committee (1993–1996)
Outside of politics, Zimmerman was the director of the Werner Wildlife Museum and Wyoming State Wastewater Training Center, chairman and CEO of the Wyoming Employee Resource Capital & Service, and trustee of the John Templeton Foundation, as well as the Zimmerman Family Foundation.

Honors and awards
In 2019, Zimmerman was honored by St. Anthony Tri-Parish Catholic School for his contributions and work in the community.

Personal life
After retiring from politics, Zimmerman worked in philanthropy and civic organizations in Wyoming that promote marksmanship, hunting, and conservation.

Zimmerman met his future wife, Lois, while in the service. They had four children together. Following Lois's death in 1975, Zimmerman married Anne Templeton, a surgeon. Anne died in 2004.

Notes

References

External links
Official page at the Wyoming Legislature

1933 births
Living people
Republican Party Wyoming state senators
Republican Party members of the Wyoming House of Representatives
Educators from Wyoming
University of Montana alumni
People from Dodge City, Kansas